Rollins is a surname. It may also refer to:

Places
In the United States
 Rollins, Georgia, an unincorporated community
 Rollins, Minnesota, an unincorporated community
 Rollins, Montana, a census-designated place
 Rollins Mountain, Maine
 Rollins Pass, Rocky Mountains, Colorado
 Rollins State Park, New Hampshire

Other
 Rollins, Inc., North American consumer and commercial services company founded in 1948
 Rollins School of Public Health, part of Emory University
 Rollins College, Florida
 Rollins House, a historic home in Florida
 USNS Rollins (T-AG-189)
 Rollins A. Emerson (1873–1947), American geneticist

See also
 Rollins Band, an American rock group led by Henry Rollins
 Young & Rollins, a guitar duo
 John R. Rollins School, a historic school in Massachusetts